Synanthedon pini, the pitch mass borer,  is a moth of the family Sesiidae. The pitch mass borer occurs on spruce and pine in eastern North America. It does not kill trees, but the pitch-filled larval tunnels in the wood cause defects in the lumber.

Description

Adults are on wing in mid July. The adults are unusual in that the wings are mostly clear, unlike those of most moths. The eggs are laid on the bark in early summer, usually near a wound or in scars or crevices. The larvae feed in tunnels on the inner bark and sapwood, causing a copious flow of pitch, which hardens on the bark. They feed for 2 or 3 years and attain a length of about 25 mm before pupating in the pitch mass. The larvae feed on pine and spruce species, including Austrian, eastern white, Scots and Jack pines as well as white, Norway and Colorado blue spruce. They create a large mass of pitch at the larval feeding site.

Adults emerge in early summer.

References

Sesiidae
Moths described in 1881